Henry Jamison "Jam" Handy (March 6, 1886 – November 13, 1983) was an American Olympic breaststroke swimmer, water polo player, and founder of the Jam Handy Organization (JHO), a producer of commercially sponsored motion pictures, slidefilms (later known as filmstrips), trade shows, industrial theater and multimedia training aids. Credited as the first person to imagine distance learning, Handy made his first film in 1910 and presided over a company that produced an estimated 7,000 motion pictures and perhaps as many as 100,000 slidefilms before it was dissolved in 1983.

Athletic activities
As a swimmer, Handy introduced a number of new swimming strokes to Americans, such as the Australian crawl. He would often wake up early and devise new strokes to give him an edge over other swimmers. Swimming led to him getting a bronze in the 1904 Olympics at St. Louis, Missouri. Twenty years later he was part of the Illinois Athletic Club water polo team at the 1924 Olympics in Paris, France, again winning a bronze medal. With his participation, he established a new record for the longest period of time between first and last Olympic competitions. Handy swam almost every day until the last few months of his life.

Handy appeared swimming in a commercial from 1978 asking for the public to support American athletes training for the 1980 Olympic games before the boycott. At the time of his filming, he was the oldest living United States Olympic medalist.

In 1965, Handy was inducted into the International Swimming Hall of Fame. In 1977, he was inducted into the USA Water Polo Hall of Fame.

Biography
Handy attended North Division High School (now Lincoln Park High School) in Chicago, and then the University of Michigan during the 1902–03 academic year. During that time he was working as a campus correspondent for the Chicago Tribune when on May 8 he wrote an article about a lecture in the Elocution 2 class given by Prof. Thomas C. Trueblood as a "course in lovemaking." Handy went on to describe how Trueblood had dropped to a bended knee in order to demonstrate how to make an effective marriage proposal. John T. McCutcheon, a Chicago Record Herald cartoonist, followed the next day with a cartoon about a "Professor Foxy Truesport" showing his class how to best make love.

Neither Trueblood nor university President James B. Angell were amused. Ten days after the initial article was published, Handy was suspended for a year for "publishing false and injurious statements affecting the character of the work of one of the Professors." Handy was told he could re-apply one year later. Instead, Handy decided to apply to a different school, but he was unable to gain acceptance to other schools because of what had happened at the University of Michigan. Handy was accepted to the University of Pennsylvania but was told to leave after two weeks of classes.

Tribune editor Medill McCormick tried to intervene on Handy's behalf, but Angell refused to change the suspension. At that point, McCormick offered Handy a job. Handy worked in a number of departments at the Tribune. It was during his time working on the advertising staff that Handy observed that informing and building up salespeople's enthusiasm for the products they were selling helped to move more merchandise. He also began researching exactly what made people buy a particular product.

Handy left the Tribune to do further work on corporate communications. He worked with John H. Patterson of National Cash Register, who had used slides to help train workers. With help from another associate, Handy began making and distributing films that showed consumers how to operate everyday products. After World War I broke out, Handy began making films to show how to operate military equipment. During this time the Jam Handy Organization was formed.

Handy was married to Helen Hoag Rogers and had five children. One of his daughter Chaille's children is the printmaker Garner Tullis. Another of his daughter Chaille's children is the inventor Barclay J. Tullis.

Filmmaking

After World War I, the Jam Handy Organization was contracted as the Chicago-Detroit branch of Bray Productions, creating films for the auto industry, Bray's largest private client.

General Motors selected Handy's organization to produce short training films as well as other training and promotional materials. One such film was 1940's Hired! – a training film for sales managers at Chevrolet dealerships; which is also featured in the Mystery Science Theater 3000 episodes Bride of the Monster and Manos: The Hands of Fate. Many films produced by the Jam Handy Organization were collected by Prelinger Archives and may be seen and downloaded at the Internet Archive.

Master Hands, the legendary 1936 documentary sponsored film (or as was called a "capitalist realist drama"), was selected by the National Film Registry for preservation in 1999.

Between 1936 and 1938, the Jam Handy Organization made a series of six animated fantasy sales films for Chevrolet featuring a gnome named Nicky Nome, which showed new Chevrolet automobiles saving the day from villains, often in retellings of classic tales such as Cinderella, the subject of two of those films, A Coach for Cinderella and A Ride for Cinderella. The other films were Nicky Rides Again, Peg-Leg Pedro, The Princess and the Pauper, and One Bad Knight.

The Jam Handy Organization produced the first animated version of the new Christmas story Rudolph the Red-Nosed Reindeer (1948), sponsored by retailer Montgomery Ward and directed by Max Fleischer.

Handy also produced films for other companies and for schools. He's estimated to have produced over 7,000 films for the armed services during World War II. Handy was noted for taking only a one-percent profit on the films, while he could have taken as much as seven percent. He was noted for never having a desk at work, instead using any available workspace. Handy's suits did not have pockets, as he thought they were a waste of time.

Degrees
Despite Handy's troubles with the University of Michigan, his son-in-law Max Mallon, granddaughter Susan Webb, and great-granddaughter Kathryn Tullis received degrees from the school. Handy would receive an honorary doctorate from Eastern Michigan University.

Death
Handy died on November 13, 1983 at the age of 97. He swam on a regular basis until just a few days before his death.

The Jam Handy advertising and marketing firm was displaced by Campbell Ewald as General Motors' principal advertising agency.
The loss of those funds was responsible, during the year of his death, for the demise of Handy's agency, which had been located on East Grand Blvd in Detroit.

Archival sources

Handy's personal papers and the surviving Jam Handy Organization records are housed at the Burton Historical Collection at the Detroit Public Library. His family and ancestry are featured in a historical collection held at the William L. Clements Library at the University of Michigan.  The Clements Library also published a book titled Annals and Memorials of the Handys and Their Kindred by Isaac W.K. Handy, edited by Mildred Handy Ritchie and Sarah Rozelle Handy Mallon (Ann Arbor, 1992). An hour-long interview with Jamison Handy (published December 26, 1961) is available at Internet Archive.

See also
 List of Olympic medalists in swimming (men)
 List of Olympic medalists in water polo (men)
 List of members of the International Swimming Hall of Fame
 Industrial film
 Prelinger Archives

References

External links

 
 University of Michigan's March 1995 Michigan Today – A Jam Handy Production
 University of Michigan's March 1995 Michigan Today – The Suspension of Jam Handy
 Burton Historical Collection, Detroit Public Library
 Jam Handy Collection (ARS.0027), Stanford Archive of Recorded Sound
 
 
 Production log of motion pictures produced by Jam Handy Organization, 1936-1968 at Internet Archive
 

1886 births
1983 deaths
Swimmers from Philadelphia
Water polo players from Chicago
Film producers from Pennsylvania
American male breaststroke swimmers
American male water polo players
American documentary film producers
Film distributors (people)
Olympic bronze medalists for the United States in swimming
Olympic medalists in water polo
Olympic water polo players of the United States
Swimmers at the 1904 Summer Olympics
University of Michigan alumni
Water polo players at the 1924 Summer Olympics
Medalists at the 1904 Summer Olympics
Film producers from Illinois
Film producers from Michigan
Bray Productions people
Swimmers from Chicago
Sportspeople from Philadelphia